Prasiola calophylla is a species of algae.

It is one of the few marcoalgae species that can survive extreme temperatures.

The species was first described by Captain Carmichael in Lismore, Scotland.

Occurrence 
It typically occurs on damp places inland like moist soil, rocks, and trees in cold temperatures with humid climates.

It has been reported in the United Kingdom.

It has been reported in continental cities like Innsbruck in Austria.

In southern parts of Victoria Land, it was described on glactial walls. It is rare in Ross island streams. It is common in streams located in McMurdo Sound.

References 

Prasiolales